Colbasa is a former Ancient city and bishopric, now a Latin Catholic titular see.

It was located near Göldeçiftlik, to the east of Antalya in modern Turkey.

History 
Colbasa was important enough in the Roman province of Pamphylia Secunda to become a suffragan bishopric of its capital Perge's Metropolitan Archbishop, but faded.

Titular see 
The diocese was nominally restored in 1933 as a Latin titular bishopric.

It is vacant, having had only two incumbents, both of the lowest (episcopal) rank :
 Paul Marie Ro Ki-nam (노기남 바오로) (1942.11.10 – 1962.03.10) as Apostolic Vicar of Seul, also Apostolic Administrator of then Apostolic Vicariate of Taiku (South Korea) (1948.05.27 – 1948); later promoted first Metropolitan Archbishop of the same Seoul 서울 (South Korea) (1962.03.10 – 1967.03.23), President of Catholic Bishops’ Conference of Korea (1964 – 1967), emeritate as Titular Archbishop of Tituli in Proconsulari (1967.03.23 – 1971.03.10)
 Pasquale Bacile (1962.07.07 – 1964.07.05), as Auxiliary Bishop of Acireale (Italy) (1962.07.07 – 1964.07.05), later succeeded as Bishop of Acireale (1964.07.05 – 1979.11.30)

See also 
 Catholic Church in Turkey

References

External links 
 GigaCatholic with incumbent biography links

Catholic titular sees in Asia